Little Girl... Big Tease is a 1976 softcore sexploitation film directed by Roberto Mitrotti and produced by Robert F. Colesberry.

Plot
Virginia, the 16-year-old daughter of a wealthy businessman, is kidnapped by a two men, J.D. and Dakota, and Alva Coward, a woman who is her high school economics teacher. While the details of the payout of the $2 million ransom are being worked out by J.D. and Alva, Virginia is raped by the muscle-man of the outfit and is comforted by the woman, whom she has sex with. Virginia also has sex with the boss of the outfit. She enjoys having sex with the three and helps them escape after she is ransomed.

Cast
 Jody Ray - Virginia Morgan, the kidnap victim
 Rebecca Brooke - Alva Coward, Virginia's home economics teacher and kidnapper
 Robert Furey (billed as Bob Furey) - J.D., mastermind of the kidnapping and leader of the gang
 Phil Dendone - Dakota, the muscleman of the outfit who rapes Virginia
 John Gilbert - Mr. Morgan, Virginia's father

References

External links
 

1976 films
1970s crime drama films
1970s erotic drama films
American sexploitation films
American erotic drama films
American crime drama films
Golan-Globus films
1976 drama films
1970s English-language films
1970s American films